Nitrous oxide (street name hippy crack, whippets or whippits) is a gas which can induce euphoria, hallucinogenic states and relaxation when inhaled. First recorded in the 18th century at upper-class "laughing gas parties", the experience was largely limited to medical students until the late 20th century when laws limiting access to the gas were loosened to supply dentists and hospitals. By the 2010s, nitrous oxide had become a moderately popular recreational drug in some countries. Possession of nitrous oxide is legal in many countries, although some have criminalised supplying it for recreational purposes.

Nitrous oxide is a neurotoxin and its use can cause long-term neurological damage.

Effects
Nitrous oxide is used recreationally as inhalation can induce euphoria, relaxation and a hallucinogenic state.  Long-term or habitual use can lead to severe neurological damage.

Since nitrous oxide can cause dizziness, dissociation, and temporary loss of motor control, it is unsafe to inhale while standing up. So part of safer use can be to inhale it while seated, because there is a decreased risk of injury from falling. Inhalation directly from a tank poses serious health risks, as it can cause frostbite since the gas is very cold when released. For those reasons, most recreational users will discharge the gas into a balloon or whipped cream dispenser before inhaling.

It is not known if nitrous oxide causes drug dependency but its use can be habit-forming. Death can result if it is inhaled in such a way that not enough oxygen is breathed in. While the pure gas is not acutely toxic, it inactivates vitamin B12, with continued use causing neurological damage due to peripheral and central demyelination.  Symptoms are similar to B12 deficiency: anemia due to reduced hemopoiesis, neuropathy, tinnitus, and numbness in extremities.  While vitamin B12 supplementation is unlikely to prevent neurotoxicity, it is recommended as a first-line treatment when combined with abstinence.  Pregnant women should not use nitrous oxide recreationally, because chronic use is also teratogenic and foetotoxic.

Inhaling industrial-grade nitrous oxide is also dangerous, as it contains many impurities and is not intended for use on humans.  Food grade nitrous oxide is also not meant to be inhaled; the bulbs commonly have industrial lubricants from their manufacturing process on and in them.  When the bulb is punctured, these solvents can aerosolize, introducing unknown particles into the gas.  These lubricants commonly leave an oily residue on the bulb "cracker" or inside the whipped cream dispenser.

Nitrous oxide related disabilities   
In 2023, a Portland, Oregon couple became unable to walk due to spinal nerve damage caused by the recreational use of nitrous oxide.

Nitrous oxide related deaths 
From 1993 to 2016, only 30 death certificates in England and Wales mentioned nitrous oxide. Of those, 6 were in the 17-year period from 1993 through 2009, and 24 were in the 7-year period from 2010 through 2016.

In 2018, an Ohio University freshman died of asphyxiation as a result of nitrous oxide ingestion from whipped-cream chargers, allegedly as part of a hazing ritual.

In 2020, a fifteen-year-old Irish boy died after ingesting nitrous oxide, leading to Ireland's Health Service Executive classing it as a dangerous drug.

Culture and society

Discovery and early use

Inhalation of nitrous oxide for recreational use, with the purpose of causing euphoria or slight hallucinations, began as a phenomenon for the British upper class in 1799, known as "laughing gas parties". English chemist Humphry Davy offered the gas to party guests in a silken bag, and documented its effects in his 1800 book Researches, Chemical and Philosophical which investigated "nitrous oxide, or diphlogisticated nitrous air, and its respiration". Poet Samuel Taylor Coleridge described the effect as "like returning from a walk in the snow into a warm room".

During the 19th century, William James and many contemporaries found that inhalation of nitrous oxide resulted in a powerful spiritual and mystical experience for the user. James claimed to experience the fusing of dichotomies into unity and a revelation of ultimate truth during the inhalation of nitrous oxide. The memory of this experience, however, quickly faded and any attempt to communicate was difficult at best. James described a man who, when under the influence of the gas, claimed to know the secret of the universe.

Until at least 1863, low availability of equipment to produce the gas, combined with low usage of the gas for medical purposes, meant it was a relatively rare phenomenon that mainly happened among students at medical universities.  When equipment became more widely available for dentistry and hospitals, most countries also restricted the legal access to buy pure nitrous oxide gas cylinders to those sectors. Even so, its use in parties continued, with gas provided by medical professionals or restaurant workers, and by other legal or illegal sources.

20th century
A report from Consumers Union report from 1972 (based upon reports of its use in Maryland 1971, Vancouver 1972, and a survey made by Edward J. Lynn of its non-medical use in Michigan 1970) found that use of the gas for recreational purposes was then prevalent in the US and Canada.

21st century

, the gas enjoys moderate popularity in some countries as a recreational drug. Nitrous oxide has the street names hippy crack and whippets (or whippits). In Australia and New Zealand, nitrous oxide bulbs are known as nangs, possibly derived from the sound distortion perceived by consumers.

In the United Kingdom, nitrous oxide is estimated to be used by almost half a million young people at nightspots, festivals and parties. Officials in Norfolk, Hertfordshire and Thames Valley had reported increasing numbers of discarded whipped-cream chargers being found.

Recreational users generally use 8 gram (¼ oz) containers of nitrous oxide "whippets", which they use to fill balloons or whipped cream dispensers. The gas is then inhaled from the balloon or dispenser. This is necessary because nitrous oxide is very cold when it undergoes adiabatic decompression on exit from a canister; inhalation directly from a tank is dangerous and can cause frostbite of the larynx and bronchi.

Legality

United States
Under United States federal law, possession of nitrous oxide is legal and is not subject to DEA purview. It is, however, regulated by the Food and Drug Administration under the Food Drug and Cosmetics Act. Prosecution is possible under its "misbranding" clauses, prohibiting the sale or distribution of nitrous oxide for the purpose of human consumption (the recreational drug use market). Given the necessity of proving the intent of either buyer or seller in this case, though, such prosecutions are rare.

Many states have laws regulating the possession, sale, and distribution of nitrous oxide; but these are normally limited to either banning distribution to minors, or to setting an upper limit for the amount of nitrous oxide that may be sold without a special license, rather than banning possession or distribution completely. In most jurisdictions, like at the federal level, sale or distribution for the purpose of human consumption is illegal. In California, for instance, inhalation of nitrous oxide "for the purpose of causing euphoria, or for the purpose of changing in any manner one’s mental processes," is a criminal offense under its criminal code (Cal. Pen. Code, Sec. 381b). In many other countries, this substance is legal. In most jurisdictions, small N2O cartridges, used to make whipped cream, can be legally purchased by anyone. In some jurisdictions, sales of canned whipped cream using nitrous oxide are limited to adults.

In all US jurisdictions, however, distribution, possession, and inhalation are legal when done under the supervision and direction of licensed medical professional such as a physician or dentist.

United Kingdom

Supply of nitrous oxide for recreational purposes is illegal under the Psychoactive Substances Act 2016. This means anyone found to be selling or giving away nitrous oxide for illicit purposes could face up to 7 years in prison and/or an unlimited fine.

Slang terms used for the canisters in the United Kingdom include balloons, nos, whippits, laughing gas, hippie crack, chargers and noz.

Australia
Supply of nitrous oxide for recreational purposes is illegal; however, it is permissible to supply it for cooking and baking purposes. As a deleterious substance, the supply of the substance for the purposes of inhalation can result in a two-year period of imprisonment.

The canisters are commonly referred to in Australia as nangs.

Netherlands   

Usage of nitrous oxide is currently still legal, although the governing coalition is attempting to add the gas to the list of drugs prohibited by the Opium Law. On 12 June 2020, the proposal to add nitrous oxide to List II of the Opium Law was brought into online consultation, allowing the public to contribute "ideas or suggestions" relating to the ban. The government aims to bring the proposed ban into force on the 1st of January 2021. In anticipation of the proposed ban coming into law, around 90 municipalities have introduced local bans of the substance.

See also
Dissociatives
PCP
Ketamine
Dextromethorphan
Inhalant
Psychoactive drug

References

External links 
Nitrous Oxide FAQ
National Pollutant Inventory – Oxides of nitrogen fact sheet

Drug culture
Inhalants